Kuzmino is a rural locality (a village) in Vorshinskoye Rural Settlement, Sobinsky District, Vladimir Oblast, Russia. The population was 83 as of 2010. There are 2 streets.

Geography 
Kuzmino is located on the Vorsha River, 12 km northeast of Sobinka (the district's administrative centre) by road. Yelkhovitsa is the nearest rural locality.

References 

Rural localities in Sobinsky District